Opisthograptis punctilineata is a moth of the family Geometridae first described by Alfred Ernest Wileman in 1910. It is found in Taiwan.

The wingspan is 40–50 mm.

References

Moths described in 1910
Ourapterygini